Kıbrıscık District is a district of the Bolu Province of Turkey. Its seat is the town of Kıbrıscık. Its area is 562 km2, and its population is 3,114 (2021).

Composition
There is one municipality in Kıbrıscık District:
 Kıbrıscık

There are 22 villages in Kıbrıscık District:

 Alanhimmetler
 Alemdar
 Balı
 Belen
 Bölücekkaya
 Borucak
 Çökeler
 Deveci
 Deveören
 Dokumacılar
 Geriş
 Karacaören
 Karaköy
 Kılkara
 Kızılcaören
 Kökez
 Köseler
 Kuzca
 Nadas
 Sarıkaya
 Taşlık
 Yazıca

References

Districts of Bolu Province